Ray John Madden (February 25, 1892 – September 28, 1987) was an American lawyer and World War I veteran who served 17 terms as a United States representative from Indiana from 1943 to 1977.

Biography
He was born in Waseca, Minnesota. He attended the public schools and Sacred Heart Academy in his native city. He graduated from the law department of Creighton University with an LL.B. in 1913 and was admitted to the bar the same year and commenced practice in Omaha, Nebraska.

Madden was elected as a municipal judge in Omaha in 1916. He resigned during the First World War to serve in the United States Navy. After the war, he was engaged in the practice of law in Gary, Indiana. He was the city comptroller of Gary from 1935-1938 and the treasurer of Lake County, Indiana from 1938-1942. He was a delegate to every Democratic National Convention from 1940 through 1968.

He was elected as a Democrat to the Seventy-eighth and to the sixteen succeeding Congresses (January 3, 1943 - January 3, 1977). While in Congress, he served as a co-chairman of the Joint Committee on Organization of Congress (Eighty-ninth and Ninetieth Congresses), and chairman of the Committee on Rules (Ninety-third and Ninety-fourth Congresses). He was an unsuccessful candidate for renomination in 1976 to the Ninety-fifth Congress. He was a chairman of the Madden Committee.

After leaving Congress, he was a resident of Washington, D.C., until his death there. He was buried in Arlington National Cemetery.

References
 Retrieved on 2008-01-15

1892 births
1987 deaths
Creighton University alumni
Nebraska state court judges
Politicians from Gary, Indiana
People from Waseca, Minnesota
Politicians from Omaha, Nebraska
People from Washington, D.C.
Military personnel from Omaha, Nebraska
United States Navy personnel of World War I
Burials at Arlington National Cemetery
Democratic Party members of the United States House of Representatives from Indiana
20th-century American judges
20th-century American politicians